El peñón del amaranto (English Title: The Amaranth Rock) , was a Mexican telenovela produced by TV Azteca by former Televisa executive Victor Hugo O'Farrill and company O'Farrill & Associates in collaboration with Telemundo in 1993, was broadcast at 21:30 hours being the first telenovela that company.

Cast 
 Marco Munoz - Damián
 Rossana San Juan - Victoria
 Raúl Román - Armando
 Graciela Döring - Josefa
 Carlos Cardán - Flaco
 Fernando Borges - Celso
 Edith Kleiman - Porfiria
 Nubia Martí - Micaela
 Marcela de Galina - Ángeles
 Claudio Obregón - Roque
 Carlos Andrade - Arturo
 Edmundo Arizpe - Ramsés
 Roberto Bonet - Joel
 Martha Aguirre - Sofía
 Javier Bayo - Remigio
 Martín Brek - Jarocho
 Jorge Brug - Rafael
 Verenice Callejo - Jovita
 Tomasa del Carmen - Dorita
 Lucía Castell - Mara
 Angelina Cruz - Tencha
 Adriana Fierro - Samantha
 José Luis Franco - Felipe
 Martha Itzel - Amaranta
 Roberto Mateos - Diego
 Alicia Brug - Superiora
 Lourdes Bustos - María
 Álvaro Carcaño - Nacho

External links 
 

Telemundo telenovelas
TV Azteca telenovelas
1993 telenovelas
American telenovelas
Mexican telenovelas
1993 American television series debuts
1993 American television series endings
1993 Mexican television series debuts
1993 Mexican television series endings
Spanish-language American telenovelas
Spanish-language telenovelas